A tavern sandwich (also called a loose meat sandwich or loosemeat) is a sandwich consisting of ground beef on a bun, mixed with sauteed onions, and sometimes topped with pickles, ketchup, mustard, and cheese.

Unlike a hamburger, a tavern's meat is cooked loose rather than formed into a compact patty. It more closely resembles a sloppy joe, without the tomato-based sauce.

History
Carroll Dietz of Missoula, Montana, created the precursor to the tavern sandwich in 1920, referred to as a "steamed hamburger." In 1926, Fred Angell began selling his version of the sandwich at the first Maid-Rite restaurant in Muscatine, Iowa, under the name "loose meat sandwich." The name "tavern" for the sandwich is credited to David Heglin. Heglin sold the sandwiches at his Sioux City, Iowa, restaurant in 1924. After Heglin died, Abe Kaled bought the business in 1934 and renamed the restaurant Ye Olde Tavern after the sandwich. Kaled perfected the recipe for the ground beef, and the tavern sandwich spread to restaurants and bars across the Sioux City area.

The sandwich is now well known throughout the Midwestern United States, and is served not only in small, local establishments but also in franchise restaurant locations such as Dairy Queen and Maid-Rite. The Wichita, Kansas-based chain Nu Way Cafe serves a version of the tavern/loose meat sandwich called a "Nu Way". In Illinois, the sandwich is also known as a "loose hamburger sandwich". In Iowa, it is sometimes referred to as a Maid-Rite.

Cultural references
In later seasons of the American sitcom Roseanne, Roseanne Conner (Roseanne Barr) co-owns a restaurant called the "Lanford Lunch Box" in the fictional town of Lanford, Illinois, which specializes in loose meat sandwiches. The inspiration for Lunch Box was a real-life restaurant called Canteen Lunch in the Alley in Ottumwa, Iowa. In 1993, Roseanne and then-husband Tom Arnold opened Roseanne and Tom's Big Food Diner (based on the fictional Lanford Lunchbox) in Eldon, Iowa (less than 20 miles southeast of Ottumwa's Canteen Lunch), also specializing in loose meat sandwiches.

Iowa's loose meat sandwich figures in the episode "Iowa" of The Good Wife, in which a presidential candidate completing the full Grassley is forced to eat a loose meat sandwich at each stop.

See also

 List of American sandwiches
 List of beef dishes
 List of sandwiches

References

Bibliography

American sandwiches
Iowa culture
Cuisine of the Midwestern United States
Food and drink in Iowa
Beef sandwiches